Tayeb Bouzid (born 3 of February 1955) is an Algerian minister. He took office at the Ministry of Higher Education and Scientific Research (Arabic: وزارة التعليم العالي والبحث العلمي), in Algiers, Algeria on April 1, 2019.

Background 
Bouzid was born in Taxelent, Wilaya of Batna. He graduated from Washington University in St. Louis and obtained his PhD at the University of Batna. He is married and is a father of three children.

Career 
Bouzid took office at the Ministry of Higher Education and Scientific Research of Algeria on April 1, 2019.
He worked as a rector of the University of Batna 2 - Mostefa Ben Boulaid (2015-2019) and vice-rector in-charge of the External Relations, Cooperation and Communication (2012-2015). He was a member of the National Pedagogical Commission, as well as vice-rector in charge of the Pedagogy (2000-2006). He was a member of the National Pedagogical Civil Engineering Council (1992-1994) and the head of Institute of Hydraulics (1992-1994). Deputy Assistant INES Civil Engineering (1986-1990).

References 

1955 births
Living people
Government ministers of Algeria
Washington University in St. Louis alumni
University of Batna alumni
People from Batna Province